Xylophagus is a genus of flies in the family Xylophagidae.

Species

Xylophagus admirandus Krivosheina & Mamaev, 1972
Xylophagus albopilosus Miyatake, 1965
Xylophagus ater Meigen, 1804
Xylophagus bungei (Pleske, 1925)
Xylophagus caucasicus Krivosheina & Mamaev, 1982
Xylophagus cinctus (De Geer, 1776)
Xylophagus compeditus Meigen & Wiedemann, 1820
Xylophagus decorus Williston, 1885
Xylophagus durango Woodley, 1994
Xylophagus eridanus Meunier, 1908
Xylophagus fulgidus Webb, 1979
Xylophagus gracilis Williston, 1885
Xylophagus junki (Szilády, 1932)
Xylophagus lugens Loew, 1863
Xylophagus lukjanovitshi Krivosheina & Mamaev, 1972
Xylophagus matsumurae ssp. inermis Krivosheina & Krivosheina, 2000
Xylophagus mengeanus Giebel, 1856
Xylophagus mongolicus Kovalev, 1982
Xylophagus nitidus Adams, 1904
Xylophagus nudatus Nagatomi & Saigusa, 1969
Xylophagus reflectens Walker, 1848
Xylophagus rufipes Loew, 1869
Xylophagus sachalinensis (Pleske, 1925)
Xylophagus sibiricus Krivosheina & Krivosheina, 2000
Xylophagus signifer Krivosheina & Mamaev, 1972

References

Xylophagidae
Brachycera genera
Taxa named by Johann Wilhelm Meigen
Diptera of Asia
Diptera of Europe
Diptera of North America